Mark Wilkerson is an American musician, who was the lead singer and guitarist for rock band Course of Nature, previously known as COG.

Wilkerson co-wrote the song "It's Not Over" which was released as a single and as the opening track on the eponymous album by Daughtry. On December 6, 2007, the song earned him and the other co-writers a nomination for Best Rock Song for the 50th Annual Grammy Awards.

On May 3, 2007, Wilkerson gave a concert to help the relief efforts of Enterprise High School in Alabama, two months after a violent storm destroyed the school and killed eight students.

Personal life
On July 19, 2003, Wilkerson married actress Melissa Joan Hart. They have three sons: Mason (born January 2006), Braydon (born March 2008), and Tucker (born September 2012).

Discography

Albums with COG
No Time at All (2001)

Albums with Course of Nature
Superkala (2002)
Damaged (2008)

Filmography
Tying the Knot: The Wedding of Melissa Joan Hart [2003] [TV] ... Himself
Sabrina, the Teenage Witch ... Himself

Awards and nominations

References

External links

Year of birth missing (living people)
Alternative rock guitarists
Alternative rock singers
American alternative rock musicians
American male singers
American rock guitarists
American male guitarists
American rock singers
Living people
Singers from Alabama
People from Enterprise, Alabama
Rhythm guitarists
Guitarists from Alabama
21st-century American singers
21st-century American guitarists
21st-century male singers